Kozakken Boys is a Dutch football club based in Werkendam. It competes in Tweede Divisie, the highest amateur league of Dutch football.

Formed as Steeds Voorwaarts Werkendam (SVW) in 1932, it adopted its current name in 1935. Kozakken Boys was named after the Don Cossack troops, who liberated Werkendam from French occupation in 1813. One of the most prominent amateur clubs in the Netherlands, the club experienced a surge towards the higher divisions of Dutch football in the 2010s, reaching promotion to the third-tier Tweede Divisie in 2016. Kozakken Boys have won the top amateur division for Saturday clubs six times: in 1985, 1991, 1992, 1993, 1995 and 2015.

The club has played at its current home ground De Zwaaier since 2001. Before, Kozakken Boys played at the grounds Kozakkenstoep and, between 1959 and 2001, at De Vierlaan.

History

Early history (1932–1940)
The first organised football to be played in Werkendam took place during the era of mobilisation between 1914–18 by soldiers stationed in the village. It was not until some time later, in 1924, that the first football club was founded: Werkendamse Voetbal Vereniging (WVV). Shortly afterwards, other football clubs such as Door Vrienden Opgericht (DVO), Samenspel Overwint Werkendam (SOW) and Excelsior were founded, but the majority of these clubs quickly disappeared. In those years, the clubs had difficulty retaining members, as a large part of the population worked outside in the Biesbosch National Park and were away from home for weeks.

On 13 April 1932, Steeds Voorwaarts Werkendam (SVW) was founded to create a second club in Werkendam as a counterpart to DVO. When SVW transferred from the Brabantsche Voetbalbond (BVB) to the Royal Dutch Football Association (KNVB) in 1935, a club with that name already appeared to exist in Gorinchem, so that the name was changed from SVW to Kozakken Boys that year. The name was chosen as a tribute to the "Kozakstoep", a local site along the Merwede where the football club often played its matches. The site owes its name to the Don Cossacks, who crossed the Merwede River at that place in 1813 as they freed Werkendam from French occupation during the Napoleonic Wars.

In 1939, WVV ceased to exist, after which a large part of the members moved their affiliation to Kozakken Boys. Since then, the club has been the only football club in Werkendam.

Rising through the amateur tiers (1940–1970)
Until the Second World War, Kozakken Boys played within the amateur divisions of the Brabantsche Voetbalbond (BVB) and later the KNVB. From 1940, clubs from the highest level of the BVB were promoted to the Vierde Klasse of the KNVB. The rise started from 1945 and onwards, as Kozakken Boys steadily worked their way up from the Vierde Klasse Saturday amateurs to the highest amateur level in successive decades.

Years in the Eerste Klasse (1970–1996)
From the 1970–71 season, the Eerste Klasse was introduced to amateur football, in which Kozakken Boys were present from the beginning. In this period, the first championship in the highest tier was won in the 1984–85 season. In this season, it competed with SV Spakenburg and GVVV for the overall Eerste Klasse Saturday title. Kozakken Boys and Spakenburg ended even and a decider was needed. In the end, Spakenburg won the overall Saturday title in the last minutes which a 3–2 score, after a half-hour delay, while two players from both teams were sent off.

Another notable season was 1989–90, which ended in a disappointing 14th place, after which relegation to the Tweede Klasse became a fact, effectively ending Kozakken Boys run in the highest amateur division. In the following 1990–91 season, however, it won the Tweede Klasse title and achieved promotion back to the Eerste Klasse. Immediately afterwards, the positive trend continued and Kozakken Boys won Eerste Klasse championships in 1992, 1993 and 1995. The overall Saturday title, however, was not won during this period.

Hoofdklasse era (1996–2010)
In the 1996–97 season, the Hoofdklasse division was introduced by merging the three Eerste Klasse division into one overall top amateur tier. Kozakken Boys participated in this competition until the 2002–03 season, as that season ended in 14th position and subsequent relegation to the Eerste Klasse became a fact. As with the relegation in the 1989–90 season, it returned to the highest amateur division after one season, as a title was immediately celebrated in the following season.

Kozakken Boys also participated in the national cup competition, the KNVB Cup several times during this period. It played home matches against Dutch footballing juggernauts PSV Eindhoven and Ajax in the second round of the competition in the 2006–07 season and 2007–08 season, respectively. In the latter, Kozakken Boys managed to draw the match into extra time, in which it eventually lost 1–2.

The 2009–10 season ended in 8th position, which meant promotion to newly introduced top amateur level, the Topklasse, was not achieved. Therefore, Kozakken Boys would initially continue to play in the Dutch Hoofdklasse, the second highest amateur level.

In the Topklasse (2010–2016)
Kozakken Boys' aimed to achieve promotion to the Topklasse as quickly as possible. This struggle lasted two seasons, as the 2011–12 season turned out to be very successful. The regular season in the Hoofdklasse B group ended in 2nd place, missing the league title by one point behind SVV Scheveningen. Until the last day matchday, Scheveningen and ASWH competed with Kozakken Boys for the title, where all three teams won their game and the championship was ultimately celebrated in Scheveningen. The initial disappointment was quickly overcome by winning the KNVB District Cup South I for the first time in club history. As a crowning achievement for the season, promotion to the Topklasse was won in the play-offs, which meant that Kozakken Boys were represented in the highest amateur division again from the 2012–13 season.

The 2014–15 season turned out to be a historic one for Kozakken Boys. Under the leadership of coaches Arie Schep, Danny Buijs and Ton Cornelissen, the club won the Topklasse Saturday. This made the club the overall Saturday amateur champion of the Netherlands for the first time in its existence.

During this period, the club participated in the national KNVB Cup several times, with the highlight was reaching the round of 16 in the 2015–16 season, the furthest the club ever made it in the tournament. Kozakken Boys were eventually knocked out by Eredivisie club AZ, who beat them 1–3 by deciding the game in the final 10 minutes.

Reaching the Tweede Divisie (2016–)
From the 2016–17 season, the KNVB revived the formerly defunct Tweede Divisie, with the top seven clubs from the 2015–16 Topklasse Saturday automatically qualifying. With a fourth place, Kozakken Boys were among these teams and therefore played in the Dutch third-tier from 2016.

On 24 August 2016, Kozakken Boys qualified for the main tournament of the 2016–17 KNVB Cup by winning 1–5 over AFC. In the first round, Kozakken Boys had managed to win 3–0 over second-tier Eerste Divisie club Helmond Sport on 20 September 2016. At a packed Sportpark de Zwaaier, thanks to goals from Raily Ignacio, Gwaeron Stout and Everton Pires Tavares delivered a win.

In the second round of the KNVB Cup, Kozakken Boys were drawn against to Ajax, nine years after their first matchup. On 26 October 2016, it lost 1–6 to Ajax.

Players

Current squad

Former players

Honours

Domestic

League
 Topklasse/Derde Divisie 
 Winners: 2014–15
 Hoofdklasse 
 Winners (4): 1984–85, 1991–92, 1992–93, 1994–95
 Eerste Klasse
 Winners (2): 1990–91, 2003–04
 Tweede Klasse
 Winners (2): 1956–57, 1960–61
 Derde Klasse
 Winners (2): 1947–48, 1954–55
 Vierde Klasse
 Winners: 1945–46

Cup
 KNVB Cup
 Round of 16 (2): 2015–16, 2018–19
 KNVB District Cup South I
 Winners: 2011–12

References

External links
Official website 

Kozakken Boys
Football clubs in the Netherlands
Football clubs in Altena, North Brabant
Association football clubs established in 1932
1932 establishments in the Netherlands